This is the complete list of Asian Games medalists in roller sports from 2010 to 2018.

Artistic skating

Men's free

Women's free

Pairs

Skateboarding

Men's park

Men's street

Women's park

Women's street

Speed skating road

Men's 20000 m elimination

Women's 20000 m elimination

Speed skating track

Men's 300 m time trial

Men's 500 m sprint

Men's 10000 m points elimination

Women's 300 m time trial

Women's 500 m sprint

Women's 10000 m points elimination

References

Roller Sports Results Book

Roller sports
medalists